Karen Helen Atkinson  (née Aspinall; born 7 June 1978) is an English netball coach and former international netball player. Atkinson first represented England in netball in 1994, and was selected for the senior England team in 1997. During her international career, she has won bronze medals at three Commonwealth Games (1998, 2006 and 2010), as well as in the 1999 Netball World Championships. She also won silver with the England team at the 2010 World Netball Series in Liverpool.

In domestic netball, Atkinson played for the Hertfordshire Mavericks in the Netball Superleague, after having played an initial season with the Loughborough Lightning. She also played one season of the National Bank Cup in New Zealand with the Capital Shakers (2004), and one season in the Australasian ANZ Championship with the West Coast Fever (2008).

Atkinson retired from netball in 2011 and has since coached Hertfordshire Mavericks, Loughborough Lightning and the England Fast5 team.

Atkinson was appointed Member of the Order of the British Empire (MBE) in the 2014 New Year Honours for services to netball.

References

External links
2008 ANZ Championship profile

English netball players
Commonwealth Games bronze medallists for England
Netball players at the 1998 Commonwealth Games
Netball players at the 2002 Commonwealth Games
Netball players at the 2006 Commonwealth Games
Netball players at the 2010 Commonwealth Games
West Coast Fever players
ANZ Championship players
Sportspeople from Wigan
1978 births
Living people
Members of the Order of the British Empire
Commonwealth Games medallists in netball
Netball Superleague players
Loughborough Lightning netball players
Mavericks netball players
Netball Superleague coaches
English netball coaches
AENA Super Cup players
Capital Shakers players
Loughborough Lightning (netball) coaches
English expatriate netball people in New Zealand
1999 World Netball Championships players
2011 World Netball Championships players
Medallists at the 2006 Commonwealth Games
Medallists at the 2010 Commonwealth Games